Matthaeus Platearius was a physician from the medical school at Salerno, and is thought  to have produced a twelfth-century Latin manuscript on medicinal herbs titled "Circa Instans" (also known as "The Book of Simple Medicines"), later translated into French as "Le Livre des simples medecines". It was an alphabetic listing and textbook of simples that was based on Dioscorides "Vulgaris", which described the appearance, preparation, and uses of various drugs. It was widely acclaimed, and was one of the first herbals produced by the newly developed printing process in 1488. Ernst Meyer considered it equal to the herbals of Pliny and Dioscorides, while George Sarton thought it an improvement on "De Materia Medica".

Matthaeus and his brother Johannes were the sons of a female physician from the Salerno school and married to Johannes Platearius I. She is surmised to be Trota, who wrote some important treatises on gynaecology including Diseases of Women.

References

External links 

 London: British Museum, MS Harley 270, Circa instans, (1175-1249)
 London: British Museum, MS Egerton 747, Circa instans, (1280-1310)
 Munich: Bayrische Staatsbibliothek, Clm 325. Circa instans, 14th century
 Munich: Bayrische Staatsbibliothek, Incunable, Circa instans, Venice 1497
 

12th-century Italian physicians
Italian pharmacologists
Pre-Linnaean botanists
Herbalists
12th-century Italian writers
12th-century Latin writers